António Manuel Pinto Amaral Coutinho (born 8 October 1946, Aveiro, Portugal) is a Portuguese immunologist, and  the only Portuguese ISI highly cited researcher. He has been Director of the Instituto Gulbenkian de Ciência since 1998.

References

1946 births
Living people
People from Aveiro, Portugal
Portuguese immunologists